Gamits may refer to:
The Gamits, American band
Gamit, Indian ethnic group